The 1977 Nottinghamshire County Council election was held on Thursday, 5 May 1977. The election resulted in a landslide victory for the Conservative Party, which won 66 of the 89 seats on the county council. The Labour Party won just 20 seats, compared to 54 at the previous election.

Results by division
Each electoral division returned either one, two or three county councillors. The candidate elected to the council in each electoral division is shown in the table below. "Unopposed" indicates that the councillor was elected unopposed.

References

1977
1977 English local elections
1970s in Nottinghamshire